Be Up to Date is a 1938 Betty Boop animated short film.

Plot
Betty Boop's Traveling Department Store comes to Hillbillyville; the mountain folks find old uses for the new gadgets, such as using a waffle iron for ironing hair, or playing music, in which Betty joins in on the fun.

Notes
This is the last theatrical short subject cartoon in which Mae Questel voiced Betty.  After this cartoon, other people would provide Betty's voice.

References

External links
Be Up To Date on Youtube.
Be up to Date at Imdb.
 Be Up to Date at Big Cartoon Database.

1938 animated films
Betty Boop cartoons
1930s American animated films
American black-and-white films
1938 films
Paramount Pictures short films
Fleischer Studios short films
Films directed by Dave Fleischer